The Holy Trinity Church Complex is an historic church complex on 134 Fuller Avenue in Central Falls, Rhode Island.

Description

The church was a red brick structure built in 1889 to a design by James Murphy in a Gothic Revival style.  The campus also includes other Murphy designs, including a rectory (1893), convent (1905), and school (1905), and a parish house designed by Irving Gorman and built in 1925.  The complex was built by the Roman Catholic Church within the Diocese of Providence to serve the area's growing Irish immigrant community.

The complex was added to the National Register of Historic Places in 1978.  The church has since been demolished, and its location is now occupied by Veterans Memorial Elementary School. The former parish school still stands at 325 Cowden Street as the Segue Institute for Learning.

See also
National Register of Historic Places listings in Providence County, Rhode Island

References

External links 
Segue Institute for Learning website

Churches on the National Register of Historic Places in Rhode Island
Former Roman Catholic church buildings in Rhode Island
Gothic Revival church buildings in Rhode Island
James Murphy (architect) buildings
Roman Catholic churches completed in 1889
Buildings and structures in Central Falls, Rhode Island
Roman Catholic churches in Rhode Island
National Register of Historic Places in Providence County, Rhode Island
1889 establishments in Rhode Island